Szabad may refer to:
György Szabad, Hungarian politician and historian
Cemach Szabad,  Lithuanian doctor and activist
Newspapers
Szabad Föld ('Free Land'), weekly newspaper published in Budapest, Hungary
Szabad szó ('Free Word'), defunct newspaper of National Peasants Party, Hungary 
Szabad ifjúság ('Free Youth'),  defunct newspaper of Union of Working Youth, Hungary